Mehmet Ali Sanlıkol (born September 24, 1974) is a Grammy nominated Turkish-American composer and CMES Harvard University fellow who is a jazz pianist and singer that also performs a number of Near and Middle Eastern instruments as well as the Continuum Fingerboard. The Boston Globe calls Sanlıkol's music “colorful, fanciful, full of rhythmic life, and full of feeling" and "not touristy, but rather sophisticated, informed, internalized”, “...and he (Sanlıkol) is another who could play decisive role in music’s future in the world.” He is currently a full-time faculty member at New England Conservatory's Music History & Musicology Department and is the director of the Intercultural Institute at New England Conservatory.

Biography

Early life 
The son of two Turkish-Cypriots, Mehmet Ali Sanlıkol was born in Istanbul, Turkey. His father, Hüseyin Parkan Sanlıkol, was a medical doctor who got appointed by the state to a hospital in Bursa, Turkey to where the family moved in 1975. He studied western classical piano with his mother Fethiye Sanlıkol and started giving piano recitals as early as age five. After studying the first year of middle school in Cyprus Sanlıkol returned to Bursa. Throughout his teenage years he played keyboards in progressive rock bands and participated in rock festivals in Bursa along with Şebnem Ferah and Tarkan Gözübüyük.

Education 
Sanlıkol moved to Istanbul in the Fall of 1992 and studied with Turkish composer/jazz pianist Aydın Esen for about a year after which he won a scholarship to Berklee College of Music. While at Berklee Sanlıkol studied jazz composition with accomplished composers such as Herb Pomeroy and Ken Pullig. He graduated from Berklee with a dual degree in Jazz composition and Film Scoring in 1997, and completed a master's degree in Jazz Studies at New England Conservatory in 2000. After studying with composers George Russell, Bob Brookmeyer, and Lee Hyla, Sanlıkol completed a Doctor of Musical Arts degree at New England Conservatory in 2004 .

Career 
Sanlıkol formed his first 8-piece jazz band with the support of Berklee College of Music and toured Turkey in 1996 as "Mehmet Ali Sanlıkol and the Berklee Band". In 1997 he co-founded the electric jazz band "AudioFact" with Onur Türkmen. Between 1997 and 2003 AudioFact performed numerous times at distinguished clubs and festivals in the US, South America, Europe and Turkey including Blue Note Jazz Club in NY, Ryles Jazz Club in Boston, Oliverio Jazz Club in Buenos Aires, Istanbul International Jazz Festival, İzmir European Jazz Festival, International Ankara Music Festival and International Bursa Music Festival. AudioFact also released two albums in 1998 and 2003 in which they featured Bob Brookmeyer, Tiger Okoshi, Okay Temiz and Ercan Irmak.

In 2002 Sanlıkol received his first major commission to write a piece for PALS children's chorus with a soprano and tenor accompanied by Turkish instruments and a chamber ensemble. The resulting piece was a cantata, entitled Ergenekon: an ancient Turkish legend. While this piece's premiere was successful, beginning in late 2000 Sanlıkol had already shifted his focus toward extensively studying a wide range of Turkish and related musical traditions of which he knew very little since he grew up with European and American musics in his household. The discovery and exploration of his roots prompted him in helping find the non-profit organization DÜNYA based in Boston, Massachusetts along with Robert Labaree and his wife, Serap Kantarcı Sanlıkol in late 2003. Sanlıkol is the president of DÜNYA, a musicians’ collective and a record label, dedicated to exploring a cosmopolitan view of the world through the lens of a wide range of Turkish traditions, alone and in conversation with other world traditions. The unique nature of DÜNYA resulted in Mehmet Ali Sanlıkol going on the air numerous times on NPR and PRI as well as repeated coverage by the press.

While studying Turkish and related regional traditional musics Sanlıkol continued experimenting with newer ways of combining his acquired musical languages. A second cantata written for PALS children's chorus accompanied by a tenor, Turkish instruments and a chamber ensemble, entitled Keloğlan: The Bald Boy and His Magic Lute, was one such follow-up attempt in 2007. However, Sanlıkol's permanent return to composition of concert music and jazz occurred in late 2011 when he was commissioned by American Islamic Congress to compose a piece for jazz combo infused with Turkish instruments that was inspired by his own story of self-discovery about coming to learn Turkish music and culture in the United States. This was followed by commissions from A Far Cry string orchestra, the Boston Cello Quartet and Carnegie Hall which led to premieres and performances at respected venues including Ozawa Hall at Tanglewood, Isabella Stewart Gardner Museum and Zankel Hall at Carnegie Hall by American Composers Orchestra.

On the other hand, his “coffeehouse opera”, entitled Othello in the Seraglio: The Tragedy of Sümbül The Black Eunuch, bridges the musical cultures of opera house and coffeehouse, Baroque Italy and Ottoman Turkey. With music from 16th and 17th century European and Turkish sources, arranged, adapted and woven together with original music by Mehmet Ali Sanlıkol, this unique music drama is being performed on European period instruments and traditional Turkish instruments by an ensemble of specialists in those fields and, it has achieved the unique success of being a new opera that has been performed 14 times within a year and a half since its premiere.

Sanlıkol's first jazz orchestra album was JAZZIZ magazine's Top 10 Critics’ Choice 2014 pick, his second jazz orchestra album was DownBeat magazine's September 2016 Editor's Pick, "The Rise Up", commissioned by NEA Jazz Master Dave Liebman, received a 4 star review from The Financial Times, and his trio album "An Elegant Ritual" was listed among JAZZIZ's Top 10 July 2021 albums. He has composed for, performed and toured with international stars and ensembles such as Dave Liebman, Billy Cobham, Bob Brookmeyer, Anat Cohen, Esperanza Spalding, Antonio Sanchez, Gil Goldstein, Tiger Okoshi, Tommy Smith (saxophonist), Boston Camerata, A Far Cry string orchestra, American Composers Orchestra, Boston Cello Quartet, Erkan Oğur and Brenna MacCrimmon. Sanlıkol actively delivers papers and talks at academic conferences such as International Conference on Analytical Approaches to World Music and Society for Ethnomusicology and, his book, entitled The Musician Mehters, about the organization and the music of the Ottoman Janissary Bands has been published during 2011 in English by The ISIS press and in Turkish by Yapı Kredi Publications.

Personal life 
Mehmet Ali Sanlıkol has been living in Boston, MA since 1993 and is married to Serap Kantarcı Sanlıkol. The couple has a daughter, Suzan Selin Sanlıkol, born in 2006.

Awards/Distinctions 
South Arts Jazz Road Creative Residency Grant, 2021 
Massachusetts Cultural Council Traditional Artist Apprenticeships Master Artist, 2021 & 2022 
New Music USA Project Grant, 2020  
The Aaron Copland Fund for Music Recording Program Grant, 2020  
Live Arts Boston Grant from The Boston Foundation, 2020 
The American Turkish Society Moon & Stars Project Grant, 2020  
Massachusetts Cultural Council Artist Fellowship Finalist, 2019 
Live Arts Boston Grant from The Boston Foundation, 2019 
TEDx Talk, 2019 
Live Arts Boston Grant from The Boston Foundation, 2018 
Creative City Grant from New England England Foundation for the Arts, 2017 
The Aaron Copland Fund for Music Performance Program Grant, 2016 
Paul R. Judy Center for Applied Research Grant from Eastman School of Music, 2015 
Grammy award nomination with A Far Cry string orchestra, 2014
Associate of the Music Department designation at Harvard University, 2013
Fellowship in Turkish Culture and Art granted by Turkish Cultural Foundation, 2012 
Clare Fischer Award from the Professional Writing Division of Berklee College of Music, 1997

Music

Orchestral works 
 Harabat/The Intoxicated (2015)	- tenor & ud with Orchestra
 Symphonia Phrygia: a liturgical drama – Symphony No. 1 (2004) – Byzantine and Polyphonic Choir with Orchestra

String orchestra 
 A Gentleman of Istanbul: Symphony for Strings, Percussion, Piano, Oud, Ney & Tenor (2018)
 Vecd (2012)

Opera 
 Othello in the Seraglio: The tragedy of Sümbül the black eunuch (2015) – a "Coffeehouse Opera" in 2 Acts composed for 4 singers and chamber ensemble featuring European period instruments, Turkish instruments and an actor

Choral works 
 Devran – in 2 movements: I. “Ey gönül neylersin sen bu cihanı”, II. “Mevlan senin aşıkların devran iderler Hu ile” (2017)
 Şu yalan dünya (2015) – tenor, choir and piano
 Mukabele – in 3 movements: I. “Niyaz”, II. “Meydan”, III. “Sema” (2014)
 Çayda çıra (1998) – choir and piano
For Children's Choir:
 Keloğlan: The Bald boy and his magic lute (2007) – Children's choir, tenor and mixed chamber ensemble with Turkish instruments
 Ergenekon: An Ancient Turkish legend (2002) – Children's choir, tenor, soprano and mixed chamber ensemble with Turkish instruments

Chamber works 
 Byzantium (2008) – large chamber ensemble
 Misterioso (1999) – clarinet in Bb and piano
 A Princess who is in love with the color purple – in 2 movements (1998) – flute and piano

Cello quartet 
 The Blue Typhoon (2014)

Jazz orchestra 
 On the edge of the extreme possible (2000)
 What’s next? (1998)
 N.O.H.A. (1997)
With a soloist:
 The Rise Up (2019) – Jazz Orchestra and soprano saxophone
 Temmuz (2017) – Jazz Orchestra and zurna/ney/voice
 The Turkish 2nd Line/New Orleans Çiftetellisi (2015) – Jazz Orchestra and clarinet in Bb
 Concerto for Soprano Saxophone and Jazz Orchestra in C – in 3 movements: I. Medium Funk “Rebellion”, II. Ballad “Reminiscence”, III. Up-tempo Swing “Resolution” (2015)

Jazz combo 
 Better stay home (1999)
 Gone crazy: a noir fantasy (1996)
 The Blue soul of Turkoromero (1996)
With Turkish instruments:
 Suite in 3 movements as part of "Abraham": I. The Fire, II. The Sacrifice, III. The Call (2019)
 A Jazzed up Devr-i Revan (2014)
 An Afro Semai (2012)
 Palindrome (2012)
With a solo instrument and/or voice:
 A Dream in Nihavend (2014) – Jazz Combo and Continuum Fingerboard
 Whirl around (2003)
 A Violet longing (1996)

Jazz quintet/quartet/trio 
 In Search/Arayış (2019)
 An Elegant Ritual (2017)
 Umut/Hope (2009)
 Buselik (2004)
 Hasret: Anadolu Jazz (2003)
 Lost Inside (2002)
 The 7th day (2002)
 Dere geliyor dere (2000)
 Jasmine (1999)
 Mr. Downtown (1999)
 Can’t put you aside (1996)
 King of Boston (1996)
 Tribal joke (1996)
 Black dance (1995)
 Hearing Africa (1995)

Hybrid ensembles 
 A Sultaniyegah Fantasy (2011) – ney, kemençe (pear-shaped fiddle), viola da gamba and bass recorder
 A Kürdilihicazkar Canon for sackbut and voice (2011)
 Rast Fantezi (2010) – 3 zurnas, 2 clarinets in Bb, 3 trumpets in Bb, French horn, trombone, tuba, 2 nekkares (small kettledrums), 2 bass drums, 2 cymbals and kös (large kettledrum)
 Merhaba (2006) – 2 tenors, sackbut and yaylı tanbur (bowed long-necked lute)
 Ottomanist (2001) – 3 zurnas, 2 clarinets in Bb, 3 trumpets in Bb, French horn, trombone, 2 nekkares, 2 bass drums, 2 cymbals and kös
 Rast Peşrev (2001) – ney, clarinet in Bb, oboe, 2 trumpets in Bb, trombone, French horn, kudüm (small kettledrums), daire (frame drum with cymbals) and kös

Classical Turkish music ensemble 
 Pencgah Peşrev (2008)
 Beyati Peşrev “Hanım Sultan Peşrevi” (2004)
With voices:
 Nefes, Deyiş & İlahi (2005)
 Ben bir acep ile geldim (2004)
 A Buselik Canon (2001)

Selected Discography 
 An Elegant Ritual (Dünya, 2021)

Albums with Mehmet Ali Sanlıkol & Whatsnext? 
 Whatsnext? (Dünya, 2014)
 Resolution (Dünya, 2016)
 The Rise Up (Dünya, 2020)

Albums with AudioFact 
 Black Spot (Kalan, 1998)
 Asitane (Aura/EMI, 2003)

Albums with various DÜNYA ensembles 
 Come see what love has done to me (Dünya, 2005)
 The Psalms of Ali Ufki (Dünya, 2006)
 Music of Cyprus (Dünya/Kalan, 2007)
 Lale Ve Kılıç/The Tulip and The Sword (Dünya, 2007)
 Kuş Dili: The Language of Birds (Dünya, 2008)
 Dünya Size Güller Bize/For You The World, For Us The Roses (Dünya, 2009)
 A Story of The City: Constantinople, Istanbul (Dünya, 2011)
 A Sacred Music Celebration: Greek Orthodoxy and Turkish Sufism (Dünya, 2011)

Album with Shanti Records 
 Abraham: Music for Three Faiths (feat. Jazzaar Global Ensemble & Billy Cobham) (Shanti, 2019)

Singles 
 Hatam Ne?/Where Did I Go Wrong? (Dünya, 2014)

Concert DVDs 
 Wisdom and Turkish Humor (Dünya, 2007)

Films 
 Othello in the Seraglio (Dünya, 2019)

Documentary films 
 What a World (Dünya, 2014)

References

External links 
 Mehmet Ali Sanlıkol's Home Page
 DÜNYA – Home Page

1976 births
American people of Turkish descent
Living people
Turkish composers
Berklee College of Music alumni
Zurna players